The Light of the East was a monthly review founded in 1922 at Calcutta by Georges Dandoy, SJ (1882-1962) and Pierre Johanns, SJ. Dandoy was the chief editor. The monthly ceased publication in 1934.

Founding and objective
Dandoy and Johanns were young Jesuits, newly arrived in India, when they met Brahmachari Animananda, disciple of Brahmobandhav Upadhyay. Animananda encouraged them in their desire to begin a journal that would carry on the spirit of inquiry initiated by Upadhyay. P. Turmes reports that Animananda's face brightened up when the two Jesuits laid before him the proposal for a journal that would present Christ to India in a way adapted to her mentality and culture.

Both Dandoy and Johanns contributed regularly to the review. Several of Johanns' contributions were later published in book form under the title To Christ to the Vedanta. Other contributors included members of the so-called Calcutta School of Indology.

Holdings
The Indian Institute of the University of Oxford has an incomplete set. The Yale University Library has a complete set on microfilm.

References

1922 establishments in India
1934 disestablishments in India
Catholic magazines
Defunct magazines published in India
Indology
Magazines disestablished in 1934
Magazines established in 1922
Mass media in Kolkata
Monthly magazines published in India
Philosophy magazines